The Alchemist Accelerator is a venture-backed accelerator focused on accelerating the development of seed-stage ventures that monetize from enterprises (not consumers). CB Insights rated Alchemist the top accelerator in 2016 based on median funding rates of its grads (YC was #2). The accelerator’s primary screening criteria are based on teams, with primacy placed on having distinctive technical co-founders. The organization provides seed investment into companies it admits (typically $36K), and provides founders a structured path to traction, fundraising, mentorship, and community over the course of a six month program. Alchemist's backers include many of the top corporate and VC funds in the Valley—including Khosla Ventures, DFJ, Cisco, Siemens, GE, and Salesforce, among others. The accelerator seeds around 75 enterprise-monetizing ventures per year.

History
The Alchemist Accelerator was founded in 2012 by Stanford University lecturer Ravi Belani. Prior to starting the program, Belani was part of a three-year entrepreneurship education and outreach program started in the Harvard Club of San Francisco, which transitioned into the formation of the accelerator. Upon the formation of the program, Belani's former firm, Draper Fisher Jurvetson, backed the program with an initial investment. Shortly after, Khosla Ventures and US Venture Partners invested in the program. In late 2013, the company entered into a strategic partnership with Salesforce.com providing enough capital to fund the program through 2017.

Following an investment from partner, Cisco Systems in 2014, the accelerator launched a special program targeted at Internet of Things startups. The program opened up a special track of services available for IoT companies, including mentors, technology support, and facilitated access to key partners.

In 2014, the program partnered with investment site, AngelList, to launch a syndicate fund. Much like an index fund, this partnership allowed virtually any investor to invest in every member of the Alchemist class all at once.

The program

The program provides a small cash investment in the form of a convertible note. Even though the program funds startups, it does take a tuition charge as well, but provides additional capital in the note to cover the tuition charge.

Co-working space for companies in the program is provided in San Francisco, Santa Clara, and to a limited extent in Menlo Park. All elements of the program including mentors, meetings and check-ins are optional. The only exception is the Demo-Day, a one-day event that attracts roughly 200 venture capitalists to view the pitches of the startups in the program.

At the beginning of the program, companies submit a profile snapshot of their company and needs. The accelerator team syndicates the profile with customer prospects (typically Fortune 100 companies), feedback coaches for fundraising (typically trusted venture capitalists), and mentors. The program provides an opportunity for companies to meet all of these people casually during a meet and greet. Then, one to one meetings are set up, with a core focus on customers (who could do a proof of concept if it is a right fit) and VC's (who will give feedback). The intent is for startups to meet one on one with investors and customers throughout the first half of the program to fine tune their offering and pitch.

Throughout the program, the accelerator holds day-long summits. These day-long events provide startups with an opportunity to meet one on one with high level executives of companies that could be potential customers. Additionally, many venture capitalists attend the summits, providing feedback and introductions to companies looking to raise capital.

The accelerator hosts a demo day towards the end of the program where companies get access to pitch funding sources. They also host guest lectures, roundtable discussions, and other social events intended for networking.

Notable Investments
The Alchemist Accelerator has backed approximately 80 startups to date. Notable acquisitions include General Electric's purchase of Berkeley-based machine learning startup, Wise.io, Cisco's purchase of real-time collaboration software, Assemblage, and the acquisition of cloud security company Mobilespan by Dropbox.

Statistics
As of September 2019, the program has invested in approximately 400 startups.

Since its formation in 2012, 34 of its accelerated companies have been acquired.

See also
 Y Combinator (company)
 Business incubator

References

External links
 

Business incubators of the United States
Companies based in Mountain View, California